Polacca is an unincorporated community in Navajo County, of northeastern Arizona, United States. It is Hopi-Tewa community on the Hopi Reservation.

Demographics

10.4% of people over 25 in Polacca have a bachelor's degree or an advanced degree, significantly less than the national average of 21.8%.  The per capita income in Polacca in 2010 was $10,331, which is low income relative to Arizona and the nation. This equates to an annual income of $41,324 for a family of four.  Polacca also has one of the higher rates of people living in poverty in the nation, with 39.8% of its population below the federal poverty line.

Economy
The town of Polacca does not have a sales tax and there is only one convenience store.  There are no hotels, restaurants, gas stations, or department stores in Polacca.  Many of the residents are employed by one of six major employers.  Many of the residents not employed locally are artists who rely on tourists, local galleries, art shows, and internet sales.

Education
Local schools:
 Polacca Head Start
 First Mesa Elementary School
 Hopi Jr/Sr High School
 Northland Pioneer College

Employment
Local employers:
 Bureau of Indian Affairs
 Hopi Jr/Sr High School
 KUYI Radio
 The Hopi Tribe
 The Village of Sichomovi
 The Village of Tewa
 US Health and Human Services

Geography
The town of Polacca is located in northeastern Arizona on the Colorado Plateau. Natural resources on the Colorado Plateau include coal, uranium, petroleum, and natural gas. Polacca has a post office with ZIP code 86042.

Some famous places to visit nearby include, the Grand Canyon, Homolovi State Park, Canyon de Chelly, Antelope Canyon, San Francisco Peaks, and Meteor Crater,.

History and culture 
Polacca is a community located below the villages of First Mesa. Polacca got its name (originally pronounced Poo la ka ka) from Tom Polacca, brother to Nampeyo, the famous potter. He was a man of many talents, being fluent in many languages (Hopi, Tewa, Zuni, Spanish, English, etc.) and having a great mind for innovation. He was also the first businessman on the Hopi Reservation.

The town of Polacca is directly below First Mesa and is home to members of the Hopi tribe.  Included in Polacca are:  a convenience store, three churches, a Head Start school, an elementary school, and a health care center.  The healthcare center is an Indian Health Service facility named the Hopi Health Care Center and provides emergency services 24-hours a day, 7-days a week.

The residents of Polacca are employed locally by the US Health and Human Services, Bureau of Indian Affairs, the Hopi Tribe, McGee's trading post, and many are self-employed.  According to the site, Sperling's Best Places to Live, there were 2,046 people living in Polacca in 2016.

In Polacca, crops consist of corn, lima beans, grapes, squash, apricots, watermelon, and peaches.  Corn is an important and sacred crop to the Hopi people.  Blue corn is used to make somiviki, piki, tortillas, and pancakes.  Squash is an important part of the Hopi diet, and has been used to make both eating utensils and musical instruments.

Polacca residents also raise cattle, horses, chickens, goats, and sheep.  Mutton is a vital part of the diet during ceremonial and other events, such as baby naming and wedding ceremonies.

Residents also produce a variety of elegant arts and crafts, such as pottery, Kachina dolls, rattles, bows & arrows, baskets, jewelry and oil painting.  Some notable artists from Polacca include:  Anita Polacca, Nolan Youvella, Romona Ami, Neil David Sr., Tawnya Mahle, Lydia Huma Mahle, Emerson Ami, Dorothy Ami, Karen Abeita, and Nampeyo.

The Polacca Head Start Center is active in the revitalization of the Hopi language. Its Shooting Stars Hopi Lavayi Radio Project broadcasts for students in the First Mesa Dialect are carried on KUYI, 88.1 FM.

See also

Arizona Tewa
Walpi, Arizona — includes Tewa Pueblo history.

References

Unincorporated communities in Navajo County, Arizona
Hopi Reservation
Unincorporated communities in Arizona